Mere Humrahi() is a Pakistani television series originally broadcast by ARY Digital in 2013. It is produced by Fahad Mustafa and Dr. Ali Kazmi under Big Bang Entertainment. It stars Sonya Hussain, Fahad Mustafa and Shehzad Sheikh.

It was also telecasted on Zindagi under the title Mere Humnawa.

Plot outline
A girl who has been dumped by her fiancé just one day before the marriage tries to commit suicide. Later, the fiancé's brother marries the girl to save her honour.

Summary
The story starts with Haniya who is going to marry Ahad. Her parents Zubair and Humaira are happy for her. Meanwhile, Zubeida's friends ask Ahad many things. Zubeida says that it is his choice. One day before the marriage Ahad goes for a party where his friends provoke him against Haniya. They are successful and Ahad rejects Haniya because he thinks it is too early to marry. Meanwhile, Ahsan has a complex relationship with his wife Samina. Samina is not going to come in the marriage. Ahad runs from there and Haniya tries to commit suicide.  Now Ahmed comes in between and promises that he will marry Haniya. Zubair is happy. Haniya forcefully accepts this marriage and finally Samina attends the marriage. Later, Haniya falls in love with Ahmed.

Cast 

 Soniya Hussain as Haniya Ahmed
 Fahad Mustafa as Ahmed; Haniya's Husband
 Shehzad Sheikh as Aahad; Ahmed's Brother
 Ismat Zaidi as Zubeida; Ahmed & Aahad's Mother
 Shehryar Zaidi as Naeem; Ahmed & Aahad's Father
 Munawar Saeed as Zubair; Haniya's Father
 Ismat Iqbal as Humaira; Haniya's Mother
 Khalid Malik as Ahsan; Haniya's brother
 Mahira Abbasi as Samina; Ahsan's wife
 Afshan Qureshi as Samina's mother
 Diya Mughal as Samina's brother's wife
 Omer Shahzad as Zaheer; Samin's Brother

References

External links 
 Official website

Pakistani drama television series
ARY Digital original programming
Urdu-language telenovelas
2013 Pakistani television series debuts
2013 Pakistani television series endings